Elderslie railway station was a railway station serving the west of Elderslie, Scotland, originally as part of the Glasgow, Paisley, Kilmarnock and Ayr Railway (now the Ayrshire Coast Line).

History 
The station opened on 21 July 1840.
The station was grand in design, and had four platforms, with the station building extended out over the two central platforms. It had a covered walkway out into Elderslie Main Road. It was a busy railway intersection, as all mainline traffic from Glasgow - Ayr/Stranraer passed through it, as well as the Paisley Canal Line, the Dalry and North Johnstone Line, and the Bridge of Weir Railway.
To the east of the station was Canal Junction, with the line dividing between the line to Glasgow via Paisley Gilmour Street and the line via Paisley Canal; whilst to the west a dive-under junction provided connections to the North Johnstone line and the line to Greenock Princes Pier, via Kilmacolm.

Elderslie station closed on 14 February 1966 and was demolished shortly after, however it remained a junction until the closure of the Paisley Canal Line through to Kilmacolm in 1983. Following the Ayrshire Coast Line electrification in 1986, an Up Passenger Loop remains, and the line to the south west is signalled for bi-directional working. All that remains of the station now is the bricked off entrance on the main road, which once led to the covered walkway, and a large brick abutment adjacent to the current Glasgow to Ayr line.

References

Notes

Sources 

 

Beeching closures in Scotland
Disused railway stations in Renfrewshire
Railway stations in Great Britain opened in 1840
Railway stations in Great Britain closed in 1966
Former Glasgow and South Western Railway stations
Johnstone